Calcifer may refer to:
 Calcifer (Howl's Moving Castle), a character in the 1986 novel Howl's Moving Castle
 Calcifer, a character in the 2004 film Howl's Moving Castle
 Calcifer, Queensland, a ghost town in Australia

See also 
 Calcifier, an agent of calcification
 Calciferous, a descriptor for some types of rocks
 Calciferol, or Vitamin D